The George Polk Awards in Journalism are a series of American journalism awards presented annually by Long Island University in New York in the United States. A writer for Idea Lab, a group blog hosted on the website of PBS, described the award as "one of only a couple of journalism prizes that means anything".

History 
The awards were established in 1949 in memory of George Polk, a CBS correspondent who was murdered in 1948 while covering the Greek Civil War (1946–49). In 2009, former New York Times editor John Darnton was named curator of the George Polk Awards.

Josh Marshall's blog, Talking Points Memo, was the first blog to receive the Polk Award in 2008 for its reporting on the 2006 U.S. Attorneys scandal.

List of award recipients

Categories
 
 Foreign reporting
 Radio reporting
 Photojournalism
 Economics reporting
 Business reporting
 Labor reporting
 Legal reporting
 National reporting
 Internet reporting
 Magazine reporting
 Military reporting
 State reporting
 Education reporting
 Local reporting
 Television reporting
 Documentary Film (introduced in 2014)
 
In addition, the George Polk Career Award is given in recognition of an individual's lifelong achievements.

References

George Polk Award recipients
American journalism awards
Awards established in 1949
Career awards
1949 establishments in New York (state)
Long Island University